Bruneau is a French surname meaning "the brown or dark [haired / skinned] one". It is the (western) variant form of the French surnames Brunel, Burnel, Busnel, Bunel (often anglicized as Brunell, Burnell). Notable people with the surname include:

Alfred Bruneau, French composer
Carol Bruneau, Canadian writer
Peppi Bruneau, American lawyer and politician
Pierre Bruneau (disambiguation)
Romane Bruneau (born 1996), French footballer
Sharon Bruneau, bodybuilder and fitness competitor
Kevin Bruneau, (b.1968) t.v. actor and auctioneer

French-language surnames